2003 was designated as the International Year of Deserts and Desertification.

Events

January
 January 1–January 4 – Russia temporarily cuts shipment of natural gas to Ukraine during a price dispute.
 January 12 – A stampede during the Stoning of the Devil ritual on the last day at the Hajj in Mina, Saudi Arabia, kills at least 362 pilgrims.
 January 15 – NASA's Stardust mission successfully ends, the first to return dust from a comet.
 January 19 – NASA launches the first interplanetary space probe to Pluto, the New Horizons.
 January 25 – Hamas wins the 2006 Palestinian legislative election.

February
 February 4 – Egyptian passenger ferry, sinks in the Red Sea off the coast of Saudi Arabia, killing over 1,000 people.
 February 6 – Stephen Harper is sworn in as the Prime Minister of Canada.
 February 10–26 – The 2006 Winter Olympics are held in Turin, Italy.
 February 17 – A massive mudslide occurs in Southern Leyte, Philippines killing an estimated 1,126 people.
 February 22 – 2006 al-Askari mosque bombing: Explosions occurred at the al-Askari Shrine in Samara, Iraq. The attack on the shrine, one of the holiest sites in Shia Islam, caused the escalation of sectarian violence in Iraq into a full-scale war (the Iraqi Civil War of 2006-2008).

March
 March 9 – NASA's Cassini–Huygens spacecraft announces a geyser-like emission of vapor, dust, and small ice crystals on Saturn's moon Enceladus, possibly indicating the presence of water.
 March 10 – NASA's Mars Reconnaissance Orbiter enters orbit around Mars.
 March 10 – Michelle Bachelet becomes the first female president of Chile.
 March 15 – The United Nations General Assembly votes overwhelmingly to establish the United Nations Human Rights Council.
 March 21 – Microblogging and social networking service website Twitter launched.

April
 April 4 – The Faddoul Brothers, kidnapped on 23 February 2006 in Caracas, Venezuela, are found dead, causing outrage and mass protests against insecurity in the country.
 April 11
 The European Space Agency's Venus Express spaceprobe enters Venus' orbit.
 President Mahmoud Ahmadinejad confirms that Iran has successfully produced a few grams of low-grade enriched uranium.
 April 20 – Iran announces a deal with Russia, involving a joint uranium enrichment firm on Russian soil; nine days later Iran announces that it will not move all activity to Russia, thus leading to a de facto termination of the deal.

May
 May 17 – The Human Genome Project publishes the final chromosome sequence, in Nature.
 May 18–20 – The Eurovision Song Contest 2006 takes place in Athens, Greece, and is won by Finnish band entrant Lordi with the song "Hard Rock Hallelujah".
 May 27 – The 6.4  Yogyakarta earthquake shakes central Java in Indonesia with an MSK intensity of IX (Destructive), leaving more than 5,700 dead and 37,000 injured.

June
 June 3 – Montenegro declares its independence from Serbia and Montenegro after a May 21 referendum and becomes a sovereign state. Two days later, the State Union of Serbia and Montenegro officially disbands after Serbia declares its independence as well, ending an 88-year union between the two countries and leaving Serbia as the successor country to the union.
 June 9 – July 9 – The 2006 FIFA World Cup takes place in Germany; Italy defeats France in the final.
 June 28
 Israel launches an offensive in the Gaza Strip in response to rocketfire by Hamas into Israeli territory.
 The United States Armed Forces withdraws its forces in Iceland, thereby disbanding the Iceland Defense Force.

July
 July 1 – The Qinghai–Tibet railway begins operation, making Tibet the final province-level entity of China to establish a conventional railway.
 July 6 – The Nathu La pass between India and China, sealed during the Sino-Indian War, re-opens for trade after 44 years.
 July 11 – A series of seven bomb blasts hits the city of Mumbai, India, killing more than 200 people.
 July 12 – Israeli troops invade Lebanon in response to Hezbollah kidnapping two Israeli soldiers and killing three others. Hezbollah declares open war against Israel two days later.

August
August 10 - News was revealed of a thwarted terrorist plot to detonate liquid explosives disguised as soft drinks, aboard multiple transatlantic air flights. 
August 14 – Sri Lankan Civil War: Sixty-one female students are killed by Sri Lankan Air Force in an air strike.
 August 22 – Pulkovo Aviation Enterprise Flight 612 crashes near the Russian border in Ukraine, killing all 170 people on board.
 August 24 – The International Astronomical Union defines 'planet' at its 26th General Assembly, removing Pluto's status as a planet and reclassifying it as a dwarf planet 76 years after its discovery. Ironically, this was in the same year when NASA sent its first probe to the celestial body.

September
 September – The MP4 Watch is available to consumers in America.
September 7 – In the face of falling approval ratings and internal pressure from his government and party, British Prime Minister Tony Blair announces his intention to resign by the end of 2007.
September 7 – Partial lunar eclipse, visible over most of Africa, Europe, Asia and Australia.
 September 19 – The Royal Thai Army overthrows the government of Prime Minister Thaksin Shinawatra in a coup.
 September 22 – Annular solar eclipse, visible in Guyana, Suriname, French Guiana, parts of Brazil, and the southern Atlantic.
 September 28 – Typhoon Xangsane passed Manila on its way to causing more than 300 deaths, mostly in the Philippines and Vietnam.
 September 29 – Gol Transportes Aéreos Flight 1907 collides with a business jet over the Amazon rainforest, killing all 154 on board the former.

October
October 6 – Fredrik Reinfeldt replaces Göran Persson as Prime Minister of Sweden.
 October 9 
North Korea claims to have conducted its first-ever nuclear test.
Google purchased YouTube for US$1.65 billion.
 October 11–13 – St Andrews Agreement is held in Scotland between the British and Irish governments on devolution in Northern Ireland.
 October 13 – South Korean Ban Ki-moon is elected as the new Secretary-General of the United Nations, succeeding Kofi Annan.
 October 22 – Fernando Alonso wins his second World Drivers Championship
October (date unknown) - The Offshore MPA project is initiated.

November
 November 2 – No. 5, 1948 by Jackson Pollock becomes the most expensive painting after it is sold privately for $140 million.
 November 3 – Microsoft released Office 2007 for manufacturing.
 November 5 – Former President of Iraq Saddam Hussein is sentenced to death by hanging by the Iraqi Special Tribunal. He is later executed by hanging for crimes against humanity on December 30.
 November 12 – The breakaway state of South Ossetia holds a referendum on independence from Georgia.
 November 18 – Gulli, a children's channel launched.
November 22 – A toxic waste dumping incident occurs in Côte d'Ivoire by a Panama ship sent by Singaporean oil company, causing 3 deaths and the poison treatment of 1500 people.
 November 23 – A series of car bombs and mortar attacks in Sadr City, Baghdad, kills at least 215 people and injure 257 other people.

December
 December 1 – WikiLeaks leaks Hassan Dahir Aweys' conspiracy to assassinate Somali government officials.
December 5 – The military seizes power in Fiji, in a coup d'état led by Commodore Frank Bainimarama.
 December 11 – Felipe Calderón sends the Mexican military to combat the drug cartels and put down the violence in the state of Michoacán, initiating the Mexican Drug War.
 December 24 – Ethiopia admits its troops have intervened in Somalia.
 December 29 – UK settles its Anglo-American loan, post-WWII loan debt.
 December 30 – Former Iraqi president Saddam Hussein, was executed by hanging.

Births and Deaths

Nobel Prizes

 Chemistry – Roger D. Kornberg.
 Economics – Edmund Phelps.
 Literature – Orhan Pamuk.
 Peace – Muhammad Yunus and the Grameen Bank.
 Physics – John C. Mather, and George F. Smoot.
 Physiology or Medicine – Andrew Z. Fire, and Craig C. Mello.

New English words and terms
bucket list
crowdfunding
crowdsourcing
Eris
hypermiling
mumblecore
sizzle reel
ski cross

References